Lizzi may refer to:

 Lizzi Waldmüller (1904–1945), an Austrian actress and singer
 Fernando Lizzi (1914–2003), an Italian civil engineer